William Hurst  may refer to:

William Hurst (MP) for Exeter
William C. Hurst, Extension Specialist and Professor of Food Science and Technology
Bill Hurst (born 1970), baseball player
Bill Hurst (footballer) (1921–2005)
William John Hurst (c.1829 – 1886), NZ politician
William Hurst (civil engineer) (1810-1890), Scottish engineer linked to the first railway developments in Britain

-See also
William Hearst (disambiguation)